The Transfiguration Church It is a Catholic church built in neo-Gothic style located in the city of Krasnoyarsk, Russia. It depends on the Diocese of Irkutsk and is located on the street 20 of the Decembrists.

The Catholic parish of Krasnoyarsk, which includes mostly people from Poland, was officially established on August 1, 1836, and then depends on the Archdiocese of Mogilev and St. Petersburg. The consistory Imperial Tomsk gave permission to this parish to build a new church in 1855, in the Street of the Annunciation, which was ready in 1857.  It was made of wood and neo-Gothic style, with stucco decorations and inside walls white. It has a kind of organ "Melodikon". A new structure was built between 1908 and 1910.

See also
Roman Catholicism in Russia
Transfiguration of Jesus

References

Churches in Siberia
Krasnoyarsk
Polish diaspora in Siberia
Roman Catholic churches completed in 1910
20th-century Roman Catholic church buildings in Russia
Cultural heritage monuments in Krasnoyarsk Krai
Objects of cultural heritage of Russia of regional significance